"You Should Be Dancing" is a song by the Bee Gees, from the album Children of the World, released in 1976. It hit No. 1 for one week on the American Billboard Hot 100, No. 1 for seven weeks on the US Hot Dance Club Play chart, and in September the same year, reached No. 5 on the UK Singles Chart. The song also peaked at No. 4 on the Billboard Soul chart. It was this song that first launched the Bee Gees into disco. It was also the only track from the group to top the dance chart.

It is also one of six songs performed by the Bee Gees included in the Saturday Night Fever movie soundtrack which came out a year later.

Origin
"You Should Be Dancing" was recorded 19 January, 1 and 8 February, and 6 May 1976 with Barry Gibb providing lead vocals in falsetto. Barry had developed his falsetto to a remarkable degree in the ten months since the release of "Baby As You Turn Away" from the Main Course album on which he sang a full song in falsetto for the first time (except for its chorus). Keyboardist Blue Weaver recalls that Maurice Gibb wrote the bass line and sang the horn parts to the brass players, while Barry sang parts for Weaver to play, while guitarist Alan Kendall got in a short guitar solo for its instrumental break.

Stephen Stills was also at Criteria Studios recording the album, Long May You Run, with his band and Neil Young. Stills added percussion on the song's February sessions. Members of Stills's backing band, George Perry (bass) and Joe Lala (percussion), also worked with the Bee Gees on some songs.

Reception
Billboard described "You Should Be Dancing" as a "strong, uptempo disco cut" with the Bee Gees' "strongest singing since "Jive Talkin'."  Cash Box said that "the playing is more polished [than 'Jive Talking'], and the band does some things to the vocals, with trading off, which are highly ear-catching." Record World called it an "across the board smash< saying "'Get off your back, you should be dancing' they sing and there's no resisting the stomping beat."

Charts
The song was their third Billboard Hot 100 No. 1 and their sixth No. 1 in Canada. It ended as the No. 31 song of the year. In the '70s some of the Bee Gees' songs were deemed too uptempo for AC/Easy Listening Radio which led to "You Should Be Dancing" only reaching No. 25 on that chart. It also hit No. 4 in Ireland. In Australia, where the brothers spent a number of years in their youth, it managed only to nick the top 20.

"You Should Be Dancing" is known today as the first chart-topper in which Barry Gibb uses his now-trademark falsetto in a lead vocal (he had previously used it on the top 10 "Nights on Broadway" and on "Fanny (Be Tender with My Love)"). Earlier songs, such as "Jive Talkin'", had Gibb use a melodic blue-eyed soul vocal style.

Weekly charts

Year-end charts

Certifications

Personnel
Credits adapted from the album Saturday Night Fever: The Original Movie Sound Track.
Barry Gibb – vocals, guitar
Robin Gibb – vocals
Maurice Gibb – vocals, bass guitar
Alan Kendall – guitar
Dennis Bryon – drums
Blue Weaver – keyboards
Joe Lala − percussion
George Perry − percussion
Stephen Stills – additional percussion

E. Sensual version

In 1995, E. Sensual released a cover, titled "B.G. Tips - You Should Be Dancing", which reached number three in Hungary and number four in Finland.

Track listing
Europe: CD maxi (1995)
B.G.Tips – You Should Be Dancing (Radio Edit) (3:30) 
B.G.Tips – You Should Be Dancing (Vocal Club Mix) (6:09) 
B.G.Tips – You Should Be Dancing (Original Mix) (8:08)

France: CD maxi (Remixes, 1995)
B.G.Tips – You Should Be Dancing (DJ Albert Radio Edit) (3:49)
B.G.Tips – You Should Be Dancing (Radio Edit) (3:26) 
B.G.Tips – You Should Be Dancing (Euro Mix) (6:06) 
B.G. Tips – You Should Be Dancing (DJ Albert Progressive House Mix) (7:19) 
B.G. Tips – You Should Be Dancing (Original Mix 1) (8:06) 
B.G. Tips – You Should Be Dancing (Original Mix 2) (7:12)

Charts

Blockster version

British DJ Blockster released a cover, titled "You Should Be...", on 4 January 1999. The cover reached number three in the UK Singles Chart the same month.

Critical reception
Daily Record wrote, "This was one of the big club floor-fillers last year. Another hit proving that a few words, a catchy melody and big bass sound seems to equal a hit."

Charts

Other cover versions
The Bee Gees remixed the song in 1993 for their album Size Isn't Everything, under the title "Decadance".

American rock band Foo Fighters, under the alter ego "Dee Gees", covered the song on BBC Radio 2's Sofa Session. The song can be found on their album Hail Satin.

For its third season American TV series Glee covered this song as part of its tribute episode to Saturday Night Fever, aptly titled "Saturday Night Glee-ver." Darren Criss, Heather Morris, and Harry Shum Jr. provided lead vocals as their characters Blaine Anderson, Brittany Pierce, and Mike Chang.

See also
List of Billboard Hot 100 number-one singles of 1976
List of number-one dance singles of 1976 (U.S.)
List of number-one singles of 1976 (Canada)

References

1976 songs
1976 singles
1995 singles
1999 singles
Bee Gees songs
Blake Lewis songs
British disco songs
Billboard Hot 100 number-one singles
Cashbox number-one singles
Dance Pool singles
Ministry of Sound singles
Songs from Saturday Night Fever
Songs written by Barry Gibb
Songs written by Maurice Gibb
Songs written by Robin Gibb
RPM Top Singles number-one singles
RSO Records singles
Song recordings produced by Albhy Galuten
Songs about dancing